Aattakatha is a 1987 Indian Malayalam film, directed by J. Williams and produced by Thiruppathi Chettiyar. The film stars Ratheesh, Ilavarasi, Innocent and Captain Raju in the lead roles. The film has musical score by Raghu Kumar.

Cast
Ratheesh
Captain Raju
Ilavarasi
Raveendran
Sukumari
Jagathy Sreekumar
Innocent

Soundtrack
Raghu Kumar composed the music for the film, with lyrics written by Balu Kiriyath.

References

External links
 

1987 films
1980s Malayalam-language films
Films scored by Raghu Kumar